Male Vinice is a small settlement in the Municipality of Sodražica in southern Slovenia. The area is part of Lower Carniola and is included in the Southeast Slovenia Statistical Region.

History
Male Vinice was administratively separated from Vinice in 1998 and made an independent settlement.

References

External links

Male Vinice on Geopedia

Populated places in the Municipality of Sodražica